Puerto Rico Highway 510 (PR-510) is a tertiary highway in southern Puerto Rico. The road runs north to south in a general south-southwestern direction. The road connects PR-1 in Barrio Capitanejo, Ponce, to PR-14 in the town of Juana Díaz. Portions of the Juana Díaz portion of the road were damaged in September 2017 by Hurricane Maria.

Major intersections

Related route

Puerto Rico Highway 5510 (PR-5510) is a spur route located in between Ponce and Juana Díaz. It begins at PR-1 in Barrio Capitanejo and ends at its junction with PR-510 in Barrio Sabana Llana.

See also

 List of highways in Ponce, Puerto Rico
 List of highways numbered 510

References

External links

 Guía de Carreteras Principales, Expresos y Autopistas 

510